ORTC may refer to:

 Object Real-time Communications, an object-centric application programming interface for WebRTC
 Ohio River Trail Council, US
 Office de Radio et Télévision des Comores, in the List of radio stations in Africa